Qiu Jun (1948 – 6 February 2020) was a Chinese bodybuilder and a bodybuilding champion who claimed numerous prizes in the senior category. He won many national competitions and was ranked 2nd in the international bodybuilding tournament called "Olympic World Night" 2019, which took place in China.

Career
In 1964, after graduating from technical secondary school, Qiu, age 16 years old, entered Wuchang Vehicle Factory where he was responsible for railway maintenance. In 1990, he participated in the first bodybuilding competition in Hubei Province on behalf of the factory and got the fifth place in the province. Since then, he become obsessed with bodybuilding. When SARS outbreak in 2003 occurred, Qiu retired from the factory. His wife died two years later. He and his only daughter, Qiu Qi, lived together.

Qiu was a fitness enthusiast for the last two decades of his life. Ever since retiring in 2003, he participated in various bodybuilding competitions and won a lot of honors. He only began working out after his retirement, joining a gym and eventually going on to coach others and participating in bodybuilding competitions. In 2019, he took part in an international bodybuilding tournament called "Olympic World Night" where he won second place in the elderly category.

Death
During the COVID-19 pandemic in mainland China, Qiu was diagnosed with COVID-19. On 6 February 2020, he died from the infection at the local Red Cross hospital.

References 

1948 births
2020 deaths
Sportspeople from Wuhan
Deaths from the COVID-19 pandemic in China
Date of birth missing
Chinese bodybuilders